The following events related to sociology occurred in the 1990s.

1990
Aung San Suu Kyi's Burma and India: Some aspects of intellectual life under colonialism is published.
Zygmunt Bauman's Thinking Sociologically is published.
Raymond Boudon's The Art of Self-Persuasion: The Social Explanation of False Beliefs is published.
James Coleman's Foundations of Social Theory is published.
Troy Duster's Backdoor To Eugenics is published.
Ian Hacking's The Taming of Chance is published. 
Nicole Lapierre's The Silence of the Memory is published and wins the Bulzoni Editore Special Award.
M. Rainer Lepsius' and Wolfgang J. Mommsen's  (ed.) Max Weber. Briefe 1906-1908 is published and wins the European Amalfi Prize for Sociology and Social Sciences.
Chen Liangjin's Social Developmental Mechanisms and Social Security Functions is published.
Alejandro Portes' and Rubén Rumbaut's Immigrant America: A Portrait is published.
John B. Thompson's Ideology and Modern Culture: Critical Social Theory in the Era of Mass Communications is published.
Paul Willis's  Common culture: symbolic work at play in the everyday cultures of the young is published.
William Julius Wilson serves as the president of the ASA.
Naomi Wolf's The Beauty Myth: How Images of Beauty Are Used Against Women is published.

Deaths
February 17: Hans Speier
August 1: Norbert Elias
October 22: Louis Althusser

1991

Cornelius Castoriadis' Philosophy, Politics and Autonomy is published.
Louis Dumont's  L'idéologie allemande. France-Allemagne et retour (later translated as German ideology: from France to Germany and back) is published and wins the European Amalfi Prize for Sociology and Social Sciences.
Clive Emsley's English police: a political and social history is published.
Ron Eyerman's and Andrew Jamison's Social movements: a cognitive approach is published.
Mike Featherstone's, Mike Hepworth's and Bryan Turner's The body: social process and cultural theory is published.
Ann Game's Undoing the Social: Towards a deconstructive sociology is published.
Steven Goldberg's When Wish Replaces Thought: Why So Much of What You Believe Is False is published.
Anthony Giddens' Modernity and Self Identity is published.
Donna Haraway's A Cyborg Manifesto is published.
Nicos Panayiotou Mouzelis's Back to Sociological Theory: The Construction of Social Orders is published.
Philippe Sarasin's Die Stadt der Bürger is published and wins the Bulzoni Editore Special Award.
Immanuel Wallerstein's Unthinking Social Science: The Limits of Nineteenth Century Paradigms
Stanley Lieberson serves as president of the ASA.

Deaths
June 28/June 29: Henri Lefebvre
August 21: Oswald von Nell-Breuning

1992
Pierre Bourdieu's and Loïc Wacquant's An invitation to Reflexive Sociology is published.
Fei Xiaotong's Xingxing chong xingxing: Xiangzhen Fazhan Lunshu 《行行重行行》 (Travel, travel, and more travel: On Rural Development) is published.
Shmuel Noah Eisenstadt's Jewish civilization: the Jewish historical experience in a comparative perspective is published.
Harvie Ferguson's Religious transformation in Western society: The End of Happiness is published.
Stuart Hall's, David Held's and Tony Mcgrew's Modernity and its Futures is published.
David Lockwood's Solidarity and schism: the problem of disorder in Durkheimian and Marxist sociology is published.
Niklas Luhmann's Observations of modern trends is published.
Sal Restivo's Mathematics in Society and History is published.
Chris Shilling's The Body and Social Theory is published.
Richard Skellington's and Paulette Morris's (eds.) Race in Britain Today is published.
Alain Touraine's Critique of Modernity is published.
Carlo Triglia's Sviluppo senza autonomia: effetti perversi delle politiche nel Mezzogiorno is published.
James Coleman serves as president of the American Sociological Association (ASA)

Deaths
December 9: Thomas Bottomore

1993
Steven Goldberg's Why Men Rule is published.
Jean-François Lyotard's Toward The Postmodern is published.
Michael Mann's The Sources of Social Power (Volume 2) is published.
Michel Maffesoli's Contemplation of the World (La Contemplation du monde): figures of community style is published.
Douglas Massey's and Nancy Denton's American Apartheid: Segregation and the Making of the Underclass is published and wins the Distinguished Publication Award of the American Sociological Association.
George Ritzer's The McDonaldization of Society is published.
Renato Rosaldo's Culture and Truth is published.
Charles Tilly's European Revolutions, 1492–1992 is published and wins the European Amalfi Prize for Sociology and Social Sciences the next year.
Cornel West's Race Matters is published.

1994

Nigel Dodd's The Sociology of Money is published.
Anthony Giddens' Beyond Left and Right is published.
Deborah Lupton's Medicine as Culture: Illness, Disease and the Body in Western Societies is published.
Angela McRobbie's Postmodernism and popular culture is published.
Ralph Miliband's Socialism for a Sceptical Age is published.
Charles Murray's The Bell Curve is published.
Viviana Zelizer's The Social Meaning of Money is published.

Deaths
February 14 – Christopher Lasch

1995
Ulrich Beck's Ecological Politics in the Age of Risk is published.
Walden Bello founded Focus on the Global South in Bangkok, Thailand.
Raymond Boudon's Le Juste et le vrai is published.
Colin Crouch's Reinventing collective action: from the global to the local is published.
François Furet's The Passing of an Illusion: The Idea of Communism in the Twentieth Century is published.
Ian Hacking's Rewriting the Soul: Multiple Personality and the Sciences of Memory is published.
David Hollinger's Postethnic America: Beyond Multiculturalisms is published.
Christopher Lasch's The Revolt of the Elites and the Betrayal of Democracy is published.
Sarah Nettleton's Sociology of Health and Illness is published.
Charles Tilly's Popular contention in Great Britain, 1758-1834 is published.
John B. Thompson's The Media and Modernity: A social Theory of the Media is published.
Ken Morrison's Marx, Durkheim, Weber: Formations of Modern Social Thought is published.

Deaths
November 4: Gilles Deleuze

1996
Les Back's New Ethnicities and Urban culture is published.
Tim Dant's Fetishism and the social value of objects is published.
Stuart Hall's and Paul Du Gay's Questions of cultural identity is published.
Stevi Jackson's and Sue Scott's Feminism and Sexuality is published.
Richard Jenkins' Social Identity is published.
David Lee's and Bryan Turner's Conflicts about Class: Debating Inequality in Late Industrialism is published.
Serge Latouche's The Westernisation of the World is published.
Andrew W. Metcalfe's and Ann Game's Passionate Sociology is published.
Michel Maffesoli's The Time of the Tribes: The Decline of Individualism in Mass Society is published in English translation.
Anna Pollert's Gender and Class Revisited; or, the Poverty of 'Patriarchy' is published.
Cyril Smith's Marx at the millennium is published.
John Solomos' and Les Back's Racism and Society is published.
Mobilization: The International Quarterly Review of Social Movement Research is first published by Hank Johnston.

1997
Jean Baudrillard's A Conjuration of Imbeciles is published.
Ulrich Beck's The Reinvention of Politics is published.
Michael Bury's Health and Illness in a changing society is published.
Stuart Hall's (ed.) Representation: Cultural Representations and Signifying Process is published.
Niklas Luhmann's Die Gesellschaft der Gesellschaft (translated as Theory of Society) is published and wins the European Amalfi Prize for Sociology and Social Sciences.
Beverley Skeggs's Formations of Class and Gender: Becoming Respectable is published.
Sylvia Walby's Gender Transformations is published.
Katherine Woodward's Identity and Difference is published.
Slavoj Žižek's Multi-culturalism or The Cultural Logic of Multi-national Capitalism is published.
Neil Smelser serves as president of the ASA.
Jared Diamond's Guns, Germs, and Steel: The Fates of Human Societies is published.
Nathan Glazer's We Are All Multiculturalists Now is published.

1998
Ulrich Beck's World Risk Society is published.
Manuel Castells published the final volume of his The Information Age: Economy, Society and Culture trilogy
Anthony Giddens' The Third Way is published.
Ian Hacking's Mad Travellers is published.
Ron Eyerman's and Andrew Jamison's Music and Social Movements: Mobilizing Traditions in the Twentieth Century is published.
Serge Latouche's L'Autre Afrique: Entre don et marché is published.
Richard Sennett's The Corrosion of Character: The Personal Consequences of Work in the New Capitalism is published.
Pierre Bourdieu's La Domination masculine is published.
Gordon Marshall's and John Scott's A Dictionary of Sociology is published.

Deaths
November 6: Niklas Luhmann

1999
David Byrne's  Social Exclusion  is published.
Colin Crouch's Social Change in Western Europe is published.
Máirtín Mac an Ghaill's Contemporary Racisms and Ethnicities: Social and Cultural Transformations is published.
Germaine Greer's The Whole Woman is published.
Ian Hacking's The Social Construction of What? is published.
Charles Murray's The Underclass Revisited is published
Susan Moller Okin's Is Multiculturalism Bad For Women? is published.
Anne Phillips' Which equalities matter? is published.
Alejandro Portes serves as president of the American Sociological Association
Alain Touraine's Comment sortir du libéralisme'' is published.
Zygmunt Bauman's Liquid Modernity is published.
The Polish Sociological Review published Institutionalization of Sociology

References

Sociology
Sociology timelines
1990s decade overviews